Pungpinan is a small subdistrict of Skarpnäcks Gård in Skarpnäck borough in Stockholm that consists mostly of detached houses.

References

Geography of Stockholm